Eudalaca sanctahelena is a species of moth of the family Hepialidae. It was described from Saint Helena, from which its species epithet is derived. However, research suggests it is not from Saint Helena, but probably southern Africa.

References

External links
Hepialidae genera

Moths described in 1951
Hepialidae